Herman Henry Schaefer (December 20, 1918 – March 21, 1980) was an American professional basketball player and coach.

A 6'0" guard/forward from Indiana University, Schaefer played in the National Basketball League and National Basketball Association from 1941 to 1950 as a member of the Fort Wayne Pistons, Indianapolis Kautskys, and Minneapolis Lakers. Schaefer later served as coach of the Indianapolis Olympians.

BAA/NBA career statistics

Regular season

Playoffs

References

External links

1918 births
1980 deaths
American men's basketball coaches
American men's basketball players
Basketball coaches from Indiana
Basketball players from Fort Wayne, Indiana
Fort Wayne Zollner Pistons players
Forwards (basketball)
Guards (basketball)
Indiana Hoosiers men's basketball players
Indianapolis Jets players
Indianapolis Olympians coaches
Minneapolis Lakers players
Sportspeople from Fort Wayne, Indiana
American Lutherans